Roman Isidorovich Kondratenko (October 12, 1857 – December 15, 1904) was a general in the Imperial Russian Army famous for his devout service in the defense of Port Arthur during the Russo-Japanese War of 1904–1905.

Biography 
Roman Kondratenko was born in Tiflis, (now the capital of Georgia) as the tenth child to a retired Army major of Ukrainian origin. He was sent to study at the Polotsk Cadet Corps in Polotsk (located in what is now Belarus) with the assistance of an elder brother, and obtained a scholarship to study at public expense. Graduating with honors in 1877, he was able enter the Nikolaev Engineering Institute, now Military engineering-technical university. He got a praporshchik and was assigned to the 1st Caucasian sapper battalion. Kondratenko was admitted into the Military Engineering Academy in 1879, and in 1884 he became an attendee of the General Staff Academy. After serving some time on the engineering department (1882–1894), he received command of a regiment in 1895 and was promoted to major general in 1901 and served as chief of staff of the Amur Military District. In 1903, Kondratenko received command of the 7th East Siberian Rifle Brigade, based at Port Arthur. The brigade was expanded into the 7th East Siberian Rifle Division, and Kondratenko was promoted to lieutenant general.

Russo-Japanese War 
After Kondratenko's arrival at Port Arthur in 1903, he reorganized and improved on its already massive fortifications over a period of several months, anticipating the coming conflict with the Empire of Japan. After the start of the Siege of Port Arthur, he was the soul of the Russian defenses, personally directing efforts of the defending troops in the most difficult and dangerous areas, and overseeing repairs of the fortifications due to battle damage. Kondratenko successfully repulsed four Japanese assaults, making skillful use of both army and Imperial Russian Navy forces, and effectively functioned as third in command of Port Arthur, after General Anatoly Stoessel and Lieutenant General Konstantin Smirnov.

However, on December 2, 1904 he was mortally wounded when the armory of the fort he was defending took a direct hit from Japanese howitzer fire. Only eighteen days after his death, generals Stoessel and Alexander Fok surrendered Port Arthur to the Japanese.

After the war, the body of General Kondratenko was transported to St. Peterburg and buried in Alexander Nevsky Lavra. In the memory of Kondratenko's courage, the Japanese erected a granite cenotaph on the spot of his death.

Honors
 Order of St. Stanislaus 3rd class, 1884
 Order of St. Anne 3rd class, 1889
 Order of St. Stanislaus 2nd class, 1892
 Order of St. Anne 2nd class, 1892
 Order of St Vladimir 4th class, 1899
 Order of St. George, 4th class
 Order of St. George, 3rd class

References
Connaughton, R.M (1988). The War of the Rising Sun and the Tumbling Bear—A Military History of the Russo-Japanese War 1904–5, London, .
Jukes, Geoffry. The Russo-Japanese War 1904–1905.  Osprey Essential Histories. (2002).  .

Warner, Denis & Peggy. The Tide at Sunrise, A History of the Russo-Japanese War 1904–1905. (1975).  .

Notes

1857 births
1904 deaths
Military personnel from Tbilisi
People from Tiflis Governorate
Military Engineering-Technical University alumni
Imperial Russian Army generals
Recipients of the Order of Saint Stanislaus (Russian), 2nd class
Recipients of the Order of St. Anna, 2nd class
Recipients of the Order of St. Vladimir, 4th class
Recipients of the Order of St. George of the Third Degree
Russian military personnel killed in the Russo-Japanese War
Burials at Nikolskoe Cemetery